The 2005 NFL season was the 86th regular season of the National Football League (NFL).

Regular season play was held from September 8, 2005 to January 1, 2006. The regular season also saw the first ever regular season game played outside the United States, as well as the New Orleans Saints being forced to play elsewhere due to damage to the Superdome and the entire New Orleans area by Hurricane Katrina.

The playoffs began on January 7. The New England Patriots' streak of 10 consecutive playoff wins and chance at a third straight Super Bowl title was ended in the Divisional Playoff Round by the Denver Broncos, and eventually the NFL title was won by the Pittsburgh Steelers, who defeated the Seattle Seahawks in Super Bowl XL at Ford Field in Detroit, Michigan on February 5 for their fifth Super Bowl win. This also marked the first time that a sixth-seeded team, who by the nature of their seeding would play every game on the road, would advance to and win the Super Bowl.

The season formally concluded with the Pro Bowl, the league's all-star game, at Aloha Stadium in Honolulu, Hawaii on February 12.

This was also the final full season for Paul Tagliabue as commissioner.

Draft 
The 2005 NFL Draft was held from April 23 to 24, 2005 at New York City's Jacob K. Javits Convention Center. With the first pick, the San Francisco 49ers selected quarterback Alex Smith from the University of Utah.

Rule changes 
 The "horse-collar tackle", in which a defender grabs inside the back or side of an opponent's shoulder pads and pulls that player down, is prohibited. Named the "Roy Williams Rule" after the Dallas Cowboys safety whose horse collar tackles during the 2004 season caused serious injuries to several players.
 Peel-back blocks (in which an offensive player blocks a defender who is moving back toward the direction of his own end zone) below the waist and from the back are now illegal.
 Unnecessary roughness would be called for blocks away from the play on punters or kickers, similar to the same protection quarterbacks have after interceptions.
 When time is stopped by officials prior to the snap for any reason while time is in, the play clock resumes with the same amount of time that remained on it – with a minimum of 10 seconds. Previously, the play-clock would be reset to 25 seconds.
 During field goal and extra point attempts, the defensive team will be penalized for unsportsmanlike conduct if it calls consecutive timeouts in an attempt to "ice" the kicker. Previously, the second timeout request was only denied by officials, and thus could be used to distract the kickers.
 Players cannot run, dive into, cut, or throw their bodies against or on an opponent who is out of the play or should not have reasonably anticipated such contact.
 If the defensive team commits a dead ball foul following the end of the half, the offensive team may choose to extend the period for one more play. Previously, the half automatically ended without the defensive team being penalized.
 During a punt, if the kicking team illegally touches the ball inside the 5-yard line, the receiving team has the option of either treating the result as a touchback or replaying the down with a 5-yard penalty against the kicking team. Previously, the receiving team's only options were either the latter or taking over possession at the spot of the foul. This change prevents an ineligible player from keeping a kick from entering the end zone and becoming a touchback.
 If the kicking team commits a penalty, the receiving team can have the option of adding the penalty yardage to the return or taking a penalty and forcing the kicking team to rekick the ball. Previously they could take the latter or decline the penalty.
 If a team calls for an instant replay challenge after it has used all its challenges or is out of timeouts, it will be assessed an unsportsmanlike conduct penalty. The penalty will also be assessed if a team calls for a challenge inside of two minutes of either half or overtime, when only the replay assistant can initiate reviews. Previously, the request was only denied by the Referee. This change was made to prevent head coaches from constantly stopping the game for any reason, including to just argue with the Referee.
 Teams are only able to request an instant replay challenge by tossing their red flag to get the attention of officials. The league decided to do away with the electronic pager/vibrating alert system used by head coaches because practically all of them always used their red flags instead of their pagers anyway. (However, the replay assistant will still use the pagers to notify the officials of a replay request.)

2005 deaths 
 Steve Belichick former fullback and father of Patriots and Browns head coach Bill Belichick
 Wellington Mara Owner of the New York Giants
 Bob Tisch Owner of the New York Giants
 Hank Stram former Head Coach of the Kansas City Chiefs

Regular season

First regular season game played outside the United States 
The 2005 season also featured the first ever regular season game played outside the United States when the San Francisco 49ers–Arizona Cardinals game was played at Estadio Azteca in Mexico City on October 2 (the Cardinals won 31–14). The game drew an NFL regular season record of 103,467 paid fans. It was a home game for the Cardinals, mostly because the team rarely sold out at their then-home field, Sun Devil Stadium in Tempe, Arizona. This season was the last year that the Cardinals played at Sun Devil Stadium; the team then moved to their new Cardinals Stadium in nearby Glendale.

Effect of the 2005 Atlantic hurricane season

Effect of Hurricane Katrina 

Due to the damage caused by Hurricane Katrina to the Louisiana Superdome and the greater New Orleans area, the New Orleans Saints' entire 2005 home schedule was played at different venues while the Saints set up temporary operations in San Antonio, Texas. The Saints' first home game scheduled for September 18 against New York Giants was moved to September 19 at Giants Stadium, where the Giants won 27–10. The impromptu "Monday Night doubleheader" with the game already scheduled (Washington Redskins at Dallas Cowboys) was a success, and was made a permanent part of the schedule the next year when Monday Night Football made the move to ESPN.

As a result of the unscheduled doubleheader, the NFL designated its second weekend, September 18 and 19, as "Hurricane Relief Weekend', with fund raising collections at all of the league's games. The Saints' remaining home games were split between the Alamodome in San Antonio and Louisiana State University's Tiger Stadium in Baton Rouge, Louisiana. Being forced to travel to 13 of their 16 games (only 3 of their games were actually played in the same city where they practiced) and practice in substandard facilities and conditions in San Antonio, the Saints finished 3–13, their worst season since 1999.

The last time an NFL franchise had to play at an alternate site was in 2002, when the Chicago Bears played home games in Champaign, Illinois, 120 miles (200 km) away, due to the reconstruction of Soldier Field. The last NFL team to abandon their home city during a season was the hapless 1952 Dallas Texans, whose franchise was returned to the league after drawing several poor crowds at the Cotton Bowl. They played their final "home" game in Akron, Ohio.

Effect of Hurricane Wilma 
The October 23 game between the Kansas City Chiefs and Miami Dolphins at Dolphins Stadium was rescheduled to Friday, October 21 at 7:00 pm EDT to beat Hurricane Wilma's arrival to the Miami, Florida area. The Chiefs won the game, 30–20, and became the first visiting team to travel and play on the same day. Since the game was planned for Sunday afternoon, it is one of the few times in history that the Dolphins wore their white jerseys in a home game played at night.

Final regular season standings 

Tiebreakers
 Cincinnati finished ahead of Pittsburgh in the AFC North based on better division record (5–1 to 4–2).
 Baltimore finished ahead of Cleveland in the AFC North based on better division record (2–4 to 1–5).
 Tampa Bay finished ahead of Carolina in the NFC South based on better division record (5–1 to 4–2).
 Chicago clinched the NFC's #2 seed instead of Tampa Bay or the N.Y. Giants based on better conference record (10–2 to Buccaneers' 9–3 and Giants' 8–4).
 Tampa Bay clinched the NFC's #3 seed instead of the N.Y. Giants based on better conference record (9–3 to 8–4).

Playoffs

Bracket

Milestones 
The following teams and players set all-time NFL records during the season:

Statistical leaders

Team

Individual

Awards

Team superlatives

Offense 
 Most points scored: Seattle, 452
 Fewest points scored: Cleveland, 232
 Most total offensive yards: Kansas City, 6,192
 Fewest total offensive yards: San Francisco, 3,587
 Most total passing yards: Arizona, 4,437
 Fewest total passing yards: San Francisco, 1,898
 Most rushing yards: Atlanta, 2,546
 Fewest rushing yards: Arizona, 1,138

Defense 
 Fewest points allowed: Chicago, 202
 Most points allowed: Houston, 431
 Fewest total yards allowed: Tampa Bay, 4,444
 Most total yards allowed: San Francisco, 6,259
 Fewest passing yards allowed: Green Bay, 2,680
 Most passing yards allowed: San Francisco, 4,427
 Fewest rushing yards allowed: San Diego, 1,349
 Most rushing yards allowed: Houston, 2,303

All-Pro Team

Coaching changes 
 Cleveland Browns – Romeo Crennel; replaced interim head coach Terry Robiskie who replaced Butch Davis. Davis resigned after 11 games during the 2004 season.
 Miami Dolphins – Nick Saban; replaced interim head coach Jim Bates who replaced Dave Wannstedt who resigned during the 2004 season.
 San Francisco 49ers – Mike Nolan; replaced Dennis Erickson who was fired following the 2004 season.

Stadiums 
The New Orleans Saints played in Baton Rouge's Tiger Stadium for four games and in San Antonio's Alamodome for three games due to Louisiana Superdome damaged by Hurricane Katrina. Tiger Stadium's goalposts did not conform to NFL standards due to (a) two supports instead of one and (b) white paint instead of gold. The NFL granted the Saints dispensation to keep LSU's goalposts in place for their games.

In addition, with the RCA and Edward Jones domes both removing their AstroTurf surfaces in favor of the newer next-generation FieldTurf surface, the old first-generation AstroTurf surface ceased to be used in the NFL.

Pro Player Stadium was renamed Dolphins Stadium. Pro Player's parent Fruit of the Loom had filed for Chapter 11 bankruptcy protection back in 1999, and the Pro Player label was discontinued, but that stadium name was kept for several more years.

New uniforms 

 The Arizona Cardinals unveiled a new uniform design featuring trim lines to the outside shoulders, sleeves, and sides of the jerseys and pants. The cardinal helmet logo was also redesigned to be more aggressive.
 The Buffalo Bills added a third alternative uniform: their 1960s throwbacks with the white helmets and red standing bison logo.
 The Detroit Lions added black third alternate uniforms at the urging of president Matt Millen, a former Raider.
 The New York Giants changed their white jerseys to mimic the team's design used in the 1950s. When they last made major changes in 2000, the Giants only modified their blue jerseys to the 1950s look while keeping many of the 1980s elements on their white jerseys, such as the 1980s blue collars instead of the 1950s white collars and red shoulder stripe design.
 The St. Louis Rams began wearing navy pants with their white jerseys for selected games.

Television 
This was the eighth and final year under the league's broadcast contracts with ABC, CBS, Fox, and ESPN to televise Monday Night Football, the AFC package, the NFC package, and Sunday Night Football, respectively. This also marked the final season that ABC held the rights to televise Monday Night Football after thirty-six years of airing the series. When the TV contracts were renewed, the rights to broadcast Monday Night Football were awarded to Disney-owned corporate sibling ESPN. NBC won the rights to televise Sunday Night Football, marking the first time that the network broadcast NFL games since Super Bowl XXXII in 1998. Meanwhile, CBS and Fox renewed their television contracts to the AFC and the NFC packages, respectively.

Cris Collinsworth left Fox to sit out the 2005 season before joining NBC as a studio analyst the following year, leaving Fox's lead broadcasting team of Joe Buck and Troy Aikman in a two-man booth.

Footnotes

References

External links 
 Football Outsiders 2005 DVOA Ratings

 
National Football League seasons
National Football League